Marvin Duane "Ace" Burns (July 6, 1928 – 1990) was an American water polo player who competed in the 1952 Summer Olympics and in the 1960 Summer Olympics.

He was born in Santa Ana, California.  He played water polo for the University of Southern California Trojans.

Burns was a member of the American water polo team which finished fourth in the 1952 tournament. He played five matches.

Eight years later he finished seventh with the American team the 1960 tournament. Again he played five matches.

In 1977, he was inducted into the USA Water Polo Hall of Fame.

References

External links
 

1928 births
1990 deaths
Sportspeople from Santa Ana, California
USC Trojans men's water polo players
American male water polo players
Olympic water polo players of the United States
Water polo players at the 1952 Summer Olympics
Water polo players at the 1960 Summer Olympics